Bitter Rice is a 1949 Italian film made by Lux Film, written and directed by Giuseppe De Santis. Produced by Dino De Laurentiis, starring Silvana Mangano, Raf Vallone, Doris Dowling and Vittorio Gassman, Bitter Rice was a commercial success in Europe and the United States. It was a product of the Italian neorealism style. The Italian title of the film is based on a pun; since the Italian word riso can mean either "rice" or "laughter",  can be taken to mean either "bitter laughter" or "bitter rice".

Although Bitter Rice did not win any awards, it was nominated for the 1950 Academy Award for Best Story and entered into the 1949 Cannes Film Festival.

Production
The film was shot on location in the countryside of Vercellese. The main locations are Tenuta Selve in Salasco and Cascina Veneria in Lignana. The film's sets were designed by the art director Carlo Egidi.

Plot
The film begins at the start of the rice-planting season in northern Italy. In an effort to escape the law, two small-time thieves, Francesca (Doris Dowling) and Walter (Vittorio Gassman), hide among the crowds of female workers heading to the rice paddies in the Province of Vercelli in the upper reaches of Piedmont in the Po Valley. While attempting to board the train for the fields, the pair runs into Silvana (Silvana Mangano), a peasant rice worker. Francesca boards the train with Silvana, who introduces her to the planters' way of life. Francesca does not have a work permit, and struggles with the other "illegals" to find a place on the rice fields. After initial resistance from documented workers and bosses, the illegals are allowed a place in the fields. At work in the fields, Silvana and Francesca meet a soon-to-be-discharged soldier, Marco (Raf Vallone), who unsuccessfully tries to attract Silvana's interest.

Toward the end of the working season, Walter arrives at the rice farm and becomes involved in a plot to steal a large quantity of rice. Excited by his criminal lifestyle, Silvana becomes attracted to Walter. She causes a diversion to help him carry out the heist, but Francesca and Marco manage to stop Walter and his accomplices. Francesca and Silvana face each other, armed with hand-guns. Francesca confronts Silvana and explains that she has been heartlessly manipulated by Walter. In response, Silvana turns her gun on Walter and kills him. Soon afterwards, her guilt leads her to commit suicide. As the other rice workers depart, they pay tribute to her by sprinkling rice upon her body.

Cast
 Vittorio Gassman as Walter
 Doris Dowling as Francesca (Italian voice: Andreina Pagnani)
 Silvana Mangano as Silvana (Italian voice: Lydia Simoneschi; English dubbing: Bettina Dickson)
 Raf Vallone as Marco
 Checco Rissone as Aristide
 Nico Pepe as Beppe
 Adriana Sivieri as Celeste
 Lia Corelli as Amelia
 Maria Grazia Francia as Gabriella
 Dedi Ristori as Anna
 Anna Maestri as Irene
 Mariemma Bardi as Gianna
 Maria Capuzzo as Giulia
 Isabella Zennaro as Rosa
 Carlo Mazzarella as Gianetto

Themes
In the film, the character Silvana represents the allure of behavior modeled in American films, such as chewing gum and boogie-woogie dancing. Her downfall illustrates director Giuseppe De Santis's condemnation of these products of American capitalism. In addition, Silvana was considered by many audiences to be overly sexualized. This sexualization and the melodramatic presence of death and suicide in the film cause it to diverge from typical Italian neorealism.

Awards and honors
Bitter Rice was entered into the 1949 Cannes Film Festival. The film was nominated for Best Story in the 1950 Academy Awards.

The film was also selected as one of 100 Italian films to be saved, a collection of films that "changed the collective memory of the country between 1942 and 1978". The collection was established by the Venice Film Festival in collaboration with Cinecittà and curated by Fabio Ferzetti, with input from Gianni Amelio and other Italian film critics. Many of the films selected represent the "Golden Age" of Italian cinema, which was manifested in the neorealist movement.

References

Bibliography

External links

 
 
 
 Bitter Rice: A Field in Italy an essay by Pasquale Iannone at the Criterion Collection

1949 films
1949 drama films
1940s Italian-language films
Italian black-and-white films
Italian neorealist films
Italian drama films
Films about agriculture
Films about the labor movement
Films produced by Dino De Laurentiis
Films directed by Giuseppe De Santis
Films set in Piedmont
Films set in 1948
Lux Film films
1940s Italian films